Emstek is a municipality in the district of Cloppenburg, in Lower Saxony, Germany. It is situated approximately 8 km east of Cloppenburg.

References

Cloppenburg (district)